The tābi‘ūn  (also accusative or genitive tābi‘īn , singular tābi‘ ), "followers" or "successors", are the generation of Muslims who followed the companions (ṣaḥābah) of the Islamic prophet Muhammad, and thus received their teachings secondhand. A tābi‘ knew at least one ṣaḥābiyy. As such, they played an important part in the development of Islamic thought and knowledge, and in the political development of the early caliphate.

The next generation of Muslims after the tabi‘ūn are called the tābi‘ al-tabi‘īn . The first three generations of Muhammad’s followers make up the salaf  of Islam.

Sunni definition
Muslims from the Sunni branch of Islam define a tābiʻ as a Muslim who:
 Saw at least one of the companions of Muhammad
 Was rightly-guided 
 One who died in that state. The Khawarij are therefore not referred to as tābiʻūn even though they saw many of Muhammad's companions.

Sunni Muslims also regard the tābiʻūn as the best generation after the companions. According to Sunni Muslims, Muhammad said: "The best people are those living in my generation, then those coming after them, and then those coming after (the second generation)"

The tābiʻūn are divided by most Muslim scholars into three classes: 
 The students of companions who accepted Islam before the conquest of Mecca
 The students of companions who accepted Islam after the conquest of Mecca
 The students of companions who were not yet adults at the time of Muhammad's passing

List of tābiʻūn
The first tābiʻ to die was Zayd ibn Ma'mar ibn Zayd, 30 years after the hijra, and the last to die was Khalaf ibn Khalifa, who died in 180 AH. Alternatively, since the status of Khalaf ibn Khalifa as a tābiʻ is strongly challenged by reputed scholars, the last to die from amongst them may have been Jarir bin Haazim in 170 AH. Therefore, many of the tābiʻūn were tasked with the preservation of Islamic traditions from the era of the companions to later Muslims.
 Aban ibn Uthman
 Abbad ibn Abd Allah az-Zubair
 Abd Allah ibn Muhammad ibn al-Hanafiyyah
 Abd al-Rahman al-Awza'i
 Abd al-Rahman ibn Abi Layla al-Kindi (d. 701), transmitter of traditions on Ali and the companions, joined the uprising of Ibn al-Ash'ath and killed at the Battle of Dayr al-Jamajim.
 Abu Muslim al-Khawlani
 Abu Hanifa (80 - 150 A.H.)
 Ahnaf ibn Qais
 Ali ibn Husayn Zayn al-Abidin
 Alqama ibn Qays
 Amr ibn Uthman
 Amir al-Sha'bi
 Ata ibn Abi Rabah (d. 106 A.H.)
 Hammam ibn Munabbih
 Hasan ibn Muhammad ibn al-Hanafiyyah (d. 100 A.H.)
 Hasan al-Basri (21 - 110 A.H.)
 Ibn Jurayj
 Ibn Kathir al-Makki
 Ibn Shihab al-Zuhri (d. 124 A.H.)
 Ibn Sirin
 Ja'far al-Sadiq
 Malik Dinar
 Masruq ibn al-Ajda' (d. 103 A.H.) 
 Muhammad ibn Abi Bakr

 Muhammad al-Baqir
 Mujahid ibn Jabr
 Nafi Mawla Ibn Umar
 Qasim ibn Muhammad ibn Abi Bakr (d. 103 A.H.)

 Said ibn al-Musayyib (d. 93 A.H.)

 Sa'id ibn Jubayr
 Salim ibn Abd-Allah
 Shaikh Habib Al-Raee
 Sulaym ibn Qays
 Sulaiman al-Aʽmash
 Tawus ibn Kaysan 
 Ubayd-Allah ibn Abd-Allah (d. 98 A.H.)
 Umar II
 Urwah ibn Zubayr (d. 94 A.H.)
 Uwais al-Qarani
 Wuhayb ibn al-Ward
Yahya ibn Sa'd (d. 143 A.H.)'

 Zayd ibn Ali (d. 740 C.E. (122 A.H. ?))

  Al-Nakhai (d.714] Al-Nakhai

See also 
Salaf
Sahaba
List of Sahaba
Taba al-Tabi‘in

References

7th-century Islam

Islamic terminology